The 2023 Australian Grand Prix (officially known as the Formula 1 Rolex Australian Grand Prix 2023) is a Formula One motor race scheduled to be held on 2 April 2023 at the Albert Park Circuit in Melbourne, Victoria, Australia.

Background
The event will be held across the weekend of 31 March – 2 April. It will be the third round of the 2023 Formula One World Championship.

Championship standings before the race
Going into the weekend, Max Verstappen narrowly leads the World Drivers' Championship with 44 points, one point from his teammate Sergio Pérez, second, and 14 from Fernando Alonso in third. Red Bull Racing, with 87 points, leads the Constructors' Championship from Aston Martin and Mercedes, who both have 38 points.

Entrants

The drivers and teams are due to be the same as the season entry list with no additional stand-in drivers for the race.

Tyre choices

Tyre supplier Pirelli will bring the C2, C3, and C4 tyre compounds (designated hard, medium, and soft, respectively) for teams to use at the event.

Track changes
Following the 2021 redevelopment of the Albert Park Circuit and the removal of the turn 9–10 chicane, a fourth DRS zone was proposed and installed at turn 9. After the first day of practice session during the 2022 Australian Grand Prix weekend, the new DRS zone was scrapped due to safety concerns raised by some of the drivers. The Grand Prix chief Andrew Westacott told Melbourne’s Herald Sun that the DRS zone will be reimplemented for this edition after receiving positive feedback from the FIA and Formula One.

Qualifying
Qualifying will start 1 April 2023 at 15:00 local time (UTC+11).

Race
The race will start 2 April 2023 at 16:00 local time (UTC+10).

References

External links

Australian
Grand Prix
Australian Grand Prix
2023